Equinox is an action adventure puzzle video game developed by Software Creations and published by Sony Imagesoft for the Super NES. A sequel to Solstice (1990) for the Nintendo Entertainment System, Equinox depicts Glendaal saving his father, the predecessor's playable character Shadax, from the imprisonment of Sonia, Shadax's apprentice. The player acts as Glendaal, exploring 458 rooms in eight underground dungeons. The player collects 12 blue orb tokens while solving puzzles, killing enemies, collecting keys, navigating platforms and blocks, and battling bosses. It continues Solstices isometric puzzle game style, with greater emphasis on action adventure and Mode 7 overworld map.

Development of Equinox lasted from 1990 to 1993 and beyond the game's completion, due to difficulty running the graphics on all minor variations of SNES consoles. Brothers Ste and John Pickford were responsible for the programming, design, and visuals, and Solstice composer Tim Follin returned to work on the music with his brother Geoff. The game was released in February 1993 in North America, in November 1993 in Japan, in January 1994 in Australia, and in March 1994 in Europe. It was critically acclaimed for its graphics, sound, atmosphere, gameplay, potential lifespan, and for the extremely high challenge level of its puzzles. However, the isometic perspective garnered a more mixed response; some critics found it an intentional puzzle design aspect, some dismissed it as a technical flaw, and others said the puzzles created from it were cheap.

Gameplay 

Similar to its predecessor, Solstice (1990), Equinox is an isometric arcade adventure puzzle video game featuring elements of platform and RPG, such as using a menu screen to swap items and weapons. However, it has a greater emphasis on action and adventure than its predecessor. The player acts as Glendaal, who traverses through eight dungeons to rescue his father Shadax from the imprisonment of Sonia, Shadax's apprentice. The dungeons traversed are Glendaal's home Galadonia, the forest kingdom south of Galadonia named Tori, a desert with ancient remains east of Galadonia named Deesa, the underwater Athena, the swampy Quagmire, a sea-surrounded kingdom with a big tomb named Afralona, the Ice Palace, and Sonia's resting place of Death Island.

From smoke-puffing huts on the overworld, Glendaal enters the dungeons which contain an increasing number of rooms. The first has 16 rooms, the second 34, third 45, fourth 47, fifth 63, sixth 75, seventh 71, and the last 107. There are 458 rooms in total, double the predecessor. Many of the rooms are barred by colored doors that must be unlocked with matching keys, except red herring keys. Apples provide extra lives, and progress can be saved by simply exiting a dungeon.

In a dungeon, Glendaal moves at right angles looking for tokens shaped as blue orbs. Twelve must be collected to summon a boss, all physical manifestations of the spirits guarding the bridges to other lands in the overworld. The bosses include a Bone Head that shoots ghosts; Dung Dung, a chunk of soil that pops out of the ground and shoots boulders; Pincha; Dollop, a blob of slime; Quetzalcoatl, a sentient pole-shaped statue made up of multiple blocks; Eyesis, a spinning pyramid; and Billy Bones, a ghost pirate captain that shoots cannonballs. Getting to the tokens requires navigating platforms, moving blocks, dodging spikes, killing enemies, and increasingly complex puzzles. The isometric perspective optical illusions form puzzles, based on determining the position of platforms. The rooms all have a single objective, and in some cases rooms must be done in a specific order.

Glendaal starts with nothing, but obtains tools to attack foes in his quest. Every dungeon contains one magical spell Glendaal can perform, including those for healing, freezing, slowing down and decreasing the energy of enemies, unlocking doors, destroying rooms, and viewing invisible blocks. The magic is powered by collecting potions, defeating vampire bats and trolls in the overworld, and the dungeon bosses. Glendaal collects weapons, including daggers, swords, axes, twin daggers, swords, scimitars, maces, and twin swords. A boss kill increases Glendaal's strength and provides him with one of five strings for a harp that can be played in the Overworld to teleport.

In each room, all the foes must be eliminated to escape, and they can respawn upon reentry. Because Glendaal is killed in one hit, learning how to destroy all enemies in rooms is a puzzle. Enemies must be defeated to collect keys, potions, and tokens. Foes include ghosts, spinning devils that can only be harmed while still, bouncing blobs with random movement patterns, and plate-armored knights vulnerable on back. Most follow a set pattern, but take several hits.

Development and release 
Released in 1990 for the 8-bit Nintendo Entertainment System, Solstice was the first original product of Manchester-based developer Software Creations, after conversions to 8-bit consoles. Programmer and company co-founder Mike Webb conceived Solstice, with the intention of being a Knight Lore-style isometric game for the NES. Published by CSG Imagesoft and in other regions by Nintendo, Solstice was released to a favorable critical reception and became a cult classic for its unique mixture of action, adventure, and RPG elements. Software Creations began development of a sequel, Equinox in March 1990, four months before Solstices July 1990 release, and finished in mid-1993. It was published by Sony Imagesoft in North America in February 1993, Japan in November 1993, Australia in January 1994, and in Europe on 25 March 1994.

As the first non-Japanese developer to have a Super Nintendo Entertainment System (SNES) development kit, Software Creations began by creating Equinoxs engine, which involved analysis of the Super Famicom. The project was produced Ryoji Akagawa and Allan Becker, and executive produced by Sony's Shigeo Maruyama and Olaf Olafsson. Hiroshi Goto, Jeff Benjamin, Yuji Takahashi, Richard Robinson, and Software Creations founder Richard Kay were chief development executives, and Arthur Bangall was the chief game tester. Programming was initiated by Software Creations founder Mike Webb, and was mostly completed by Ste and John Pickford with contributions from Kevin Edwards and Stephen Ruddy. Whereas Solstice is a single-map puzzle game in which the player can only use magic, the Pickfords and Akagawa intended Equinox to be more of an action game by adding weapons, larger bosses, and RPG elements like discovery through multiple maps. In addition to Webb, Tim Follin, composer for Solstice, returned for Equinox to work on the music and sound, alongside his brother Geoff.

The Pickfords were mainly responsible for the graphics, with additional visuals from Martin Holland and Neal Sutton. The visuals took more than one year to complete and unexpectedly prolonged development. Webb reported in April 1994 that Equinox was completed 18 months prior, but its release was delayed due to technical problems running on minor variations of SNES consoles. Blocks were made as sprites and overlapped to work within available processing power, but the picture processing unit (PPU) is unable to process sprites on the same layer properly, resulting in such glitches as the foreground sprites disappearing. To fix the problem, rooms were redesigned, and sprites that disappeared were removed. Another major challenge was the isometric perspective, because 3D shadowing to indicate depth was impossible due to limited processing power. For animation and character design, Glendaal took the longest due to having many movements, and the bosses were done in a week. After the graphics were finished, the final part of development was altering the difficulty of Quagmire by removing a non-player character.

Reception

Equinox garnered critical acclaim upon release, Nintendo Game Zones Andy Butcher calling it one of the best arcade adventure games on the SNES and GameFans Brody claiming it was the all-time greatest Sony video game so far. Reviewers exclaimed Equinox stood out in the SNES library of mostly platformers and shoot-em-ups. In addition to a slower pace, atmosphere, and requiring a mixture of critical thinking and quick wits, the biggest reason was its 3D isometric perspective. The trope was the most prominent in 1980s computer games, such as Ultimate Play the Game's Filmation games, including Knight Lore (1984) and Alien 8 (1985), and in Head over Heels (1987) and Batman (1986). Critics in the European specialist press, mostly the UK, were reminded of these games when reviewing Equinox. The only Equinox reviewer to cite examples of other SNES games with the perspective was Ryan of Super Gamer, bringing up Shadowrun (1993) and Spindizzy Worlds  (1992). The isometric view led to comparisons to another adventure RPG, Landstalker (1992), released around the same time on the Sega Genesis.

The isometric perspective results in artifacts in terms of distances between sprites. Some critics viewed this as optical illusions intended to test the player, but others criticized it as a technical flaw. Detractors wrote the issue was especially noticeable with the collision detection of enemies, joking that the foes were surrounded by a big invisible forcefield of death. Frank of Super Action reported the unclear perspective caused jumps to be incredibly hard, especially those that require Glendaal to be on the edge of a platform; in these situations, the player would need "almost supernatural depth perception", where the sprite would appear to float next to a platform when actually on the edge. Game Power suggested the unclear perspective was a result of a lack of shadows. Even from reviewers who found the unclear perspective intentional, responses were mixed. The Elf of Superjuegos found it an "ingenious" design choice, and Super Control journalist Paul dismissed it as a "cop-out" for designing puzzles legitimately. A critic from German magazine Video Games said it led to unfair platform puzzles because one mistake could cause instant death. Game Zones Andy Butcher wrote that the isometric view meant it takes time to adjust to the controls, as the D-Pad is in relation to the perspective.

Game Worlds Adrian exclaimed Equinox "has the most beautiful backdrops and sprites that have been produced for ages", and Butcher stated it was some of the greatest for the SNES. The visuals were praised for their character sprites, colours, detail, and sense of hugeness in the environments. A frequent positive was the game's Mode 7 map and overworld sections, especially the "smooth" and "breathtaking" rotation feature. Keith of Super Gamer and Frank of Super Action, however, argued it was to hard to map where Glendaal was on the overworld, attributed to the removal of an auto-map that was in the predecessor. He and Camron praised the "fluid" and "realistic" animation of the characters, such as Glendaal, and noted the game does not slow down during boss fights. Frank called Glendaal's sprite one of the best of all time, describing him as "the Prince out of Prince of Persia, only cuter".

Reviewers called the soundtrack the SNES library's best, "most engaging", and "atmospheric". Brookes praised the sound effects as "amazingly realistic", citing Glendaal's pushing of a block. Hypers Andrew Humphreys noted the soundtrack's "ethereal" and "otherworldly" tone, comparing its new age style to the score of Ecco the Dolphin (1992). He claimed it was unique from other RPG games that "bombard you with a monotonous Medieval theme that loops over and over again". Frank wrote the game had "some haunting melodies and superb sound effects". Camron praised the sound, although argued it could get monotonous.

The graphics and sound were complimented for making the game atmospheric and suspenseful, and some critics admitted to being spooked by the music and sound effects and recommended to play the game in stereo. Paul of Super Control summarized, "imagine each room as approximately diamond-shaped. The rooms ranged from basic stone-floored caves to elaborate chambers with highly-carved walls and marble effect floors. Eerie sounds accompany your excursion into this underworld and each of the guardians has its own theme music!" Adrian described the sound as "sedately haunting [where] even when you're walking overland there's always a soft wind blowing so you're never really sure if a Goblin will attack you". Also cited were the music fading in and out, water drips, heartbeats, rope creaks, clangs when an armour is hit, and faraway clock chimes.

Critics reported being heavily absorbed, involved, and addicted to Equinox. The motivation to keep exploring all parts of the game's world was attributed to the graphics, music, huge spaces, high amount of rooms, and the design, such as the puzzles and mysterious placement of objects. The puzzles were frequently described as very difficult. Journalists such as Bud D. of GameFan and Sandy Petersen of Dragon confessed to being stuck for hours on some puzzles, and a Player One writer reported that he played the last dungeons as long as the prior seven combined. Nintendo Power claimed there were so many hidden doors and keys that the player had to touch every part of a room. Allie stated Equinox had more depth than The Legend of Zelda: A Link to the Past (1991) and was more "absorbing" than Knightmare (1991). Equinox was celebrated as a successful combination of multiple genres. A five-out-of-five review from GamePro writer The Unknown Gamer categorized it as an original "masterpiece" that mixes the best elements of action adventure, RPG, and puzzle genres: "there are great puzzles to solve, cool creatures to shoot; big, bad bosses; and more than challenge for even expert adventures." Garth Sumpter of Computer and Video Games was excited by its potential to appeal to both puzzle and hack and slash gamers, analogizing the game as a mix of ActRaiser (1990) and Soul Blazer (1992).

VideoGames magazine awarded Equinox the Best Strategy Game of 1994, and nominated it Best Cartridge Music and Best Gameplay. It was nominated Best Adventure/RPG Video Game by Electronic Games and awarded Best Ad of 1994 by Electronic Gaming Monthly.  In 1995, Total! ranked it 97th on its list of the "Top 100 SNES Games".

Notes

References

1993 video games
Action-adventure games
Fantasy video games
Epic/Sony Records games
Single-player video games
Software Creations games
Super Nintendo Entertainment System games
Super Nintendo Entertainment System-only games
Video game sequels
Video games scored by Tim Follin
Video games based on Arabian mythology
Video games developed in the United Kingdom
Video games with isometric graphics
Video games about witchcraft